The Orewa Speech was a speech delivered by the then-leader of the New Zealand National Party Don Brash to the Orewa Rotary Club on 27 January 2004. It addressed the theme of race relations in New Zealand and in particular the status of Māori people. Brash approached the subject by advocating 'one rule for all' and ending equitable measures and affirmative action for Māori, which he described controversially as "special privileges".

Content 
Brash covered many aspects of Māori-Pākehā relations in his speech. He criticized policies he believed to be separatist, such as required levels of iwi representation on district health boards and the allocation of Māori electorate seats in Parliament – something he labelled an "anachronism". The speech made particular reference to the Labour Party's stance on the Foreshore and Seabed Act, which Brash disagreed with. He also questioned the use of Māori spiritual traditions in official events and the open-ended nature of the Treaty of Waitangi settlement process.

Nicky Hager's 2006 book The Hollow Men claims that the speech was written, in part, by Michael Bassett, a claim denied by Bassett.

Reaction
The speech was criticised not so much for its substance but for a perceived political intent behind it. It was widely claimed that Brash was "playing the race card", winning support for his party by fuelling racist sentiment toward Māoridom. The speech itself was framed in terms of equality and pragmatism, arguing for dispensing with affirmative action programmes and poorly understood references in legislation to the principles of the Treaty of Waitangi, and ending the alleged "Treaty of Waitangi Grievance Industry". His speech was criticised by lecturer and political writer Jon Johansson: "Whether intended or not, the Orewa speech reinforced the ignorant and racist stereotype that Māori were 'savages' before the 'gift' of European civilisation was visited upon them."

The speech resulted in a major surge for the National Party, which had been languishing from an overwhelming defeat at the 2002 election. From 28% in the polls a month before the speech, the National Party jumped to 45% two weeks after it: ten points ahead of Labour.

Polls showed that many Māori were comfortable with Brash's speech, and the National Party threw its support behind it, but Georgina te Heuheu was removed as National's Māori Affairs spokeswoman after criticising it. It was instrumental in establishing a public profile for Don Brash, who had only recently become the party's leader.

Subsequent to the speech, Brash's catch-cry "need not race" was taken up by the other side of the political divide, the governing Labour-Progressive coalition. An audit of government programmes was put in place to determine whether there were race-based programmes where need-based programmes would suffice.

Several former New Zealand Prime Ministers have criticized the speech in the time since its delivery. Jim Bolger said in an interview published in 2017 it was in the same "frame" as Donald Trump's 2016 campaign, and that "some people follow absurdities". Former Labour Prime Minister Helen Clark said of Brash's motives that "he would’ve done a lot of opinion polling on that, and knew it would strike a chord".

Legacy
Brash returned to Orewa on 25 January 2005, hoping to capitalise on the previous year's success, and gave a speech on social welfare and on welfare dependency. This speech, dubbed Orewa 2, failed to generate the publicity of the original. After failing to endorse this second speech, National's social-welfare spokesperson Katherine Rich was removed. 

Brash has returned to make annual 'Orewa speeches' every year since, on a wide range of topics.

See also
 Treaty of Waitangi claims and settlements

Footnotes

External links

 Text of the 2005 speech

2004 speeches
Political history of New Zealand
Race relations in New Zealand
Māori politics
New Zealand National Party
2004 in New Zealand
2004 in politics